James Thomas Kevin Byrnes OBC (born September 22, 1948) is an American actor and blues musician.

Life and career
Byrnes was born in St. Louis, Missouri on September 22, 1948. His mother was a homemaker, and his father was a municipal accountant. In 1968 he was drafted and served in the Vietnam War for a year in the 196th Infantry Brigade. He has lived in Vancouver, British Columbia, Canada, since the mid-1970s. On February 26, 1972, he was struck by a passing car while he attempted to help move a stalled truck on the Island Highway North of Parksville, which injured his legs and forced them both to be amputated.

Fifteen years to the day after the accident, he started appearing on Wiseguy as Daniel Burroughs, better known as Lifeguard. It was his first major role and lasted until 1990. Later, he starred in the fantasy television series Highlander: The Series as Joe Dawson, a member of a secret society known as the "Watchers." He reprised his role as Joe Dawson in Highlander: Endgame and Highlander: The Source, later installments of the Highlander film series, as well as providing voices for the anime Highlander: The Search for Vengeance. He starred in his own short-lived TV show, called The Jim Byrnes Show.  He played a recruiting sergeant for the Union Army in an episode of Copper called "The Children of the Battlefield."

His other television roles include Higher Ground and cartoon voices in Beast Wars: Transformers, Beast Machines: Transformers, Shadow Raiders, Stargate Infinity, Dinosaur Train as Percy Paramacellodus, Colonel Nick Fury in X-Men: Evolution and as Duke Dermail in Gundam Wing. He appeared in the Taken mini series, which broadcast on the Sci-Fi Channel and an episode of Twilight Zone entitled "Harsh Mistress". He has also appeared on the Syfy series Sanctuary, appearing as the father of Helen Magnus, played by Amanda Tapping and as Shineoa San in  an episode of Andromeda as well as the voice of Virgil Vox in nine additional episodes.

As a musician, Byrnes has won the Juno Award for Blues Album of the Year three times, for That River in 1996 and House of Refuge on Black Hen Music in 2007, and for Everywhere West in 2011. Byrnes was also honoured at the 2006 Maple Blues Awards, as Male Vocalist of the Year. The Canadian Folk Music Awards
recognized him as the Contemporary Singer of the Year in 2006 and 2009.

In 2018 Byrnes performed with the Sojourners at a concert organized by the North Island Concert Society.

Filmography

Film

Television

Animation

Discography

Solo

 Burning (1981) Polydor (vinyl)
 I Turned My Nights into Days (1987) Stony Plain Records (vinyl)
 That River (1995) Stony Plain
 Love Is a Gamble (2001) One Coyote Music
 Fresh Horses (2004) Black Hen Music
 House of Refuge (2006) Black Hen Music
 My Walking Stick (2009) Black Hen Music
 Everywhere West (2011) Black Hen Music
 I Hear the Wind in the Wires (2012) Black Hen Music
 St. Louis Times (2014) Black Hen Music
 Long Hot Summer Days (2017) Black Hen Music

Compilation Inclusions

Vancouver Seeds 2 (1981)
Saturday Night Blues: 20 Years (2006) CBC

References

External links
Jim Byrnes Website 

 

1948 births
20th-century American guitarists
21st-century American guitarists
20th-century American male actors
21st-century American male actors
20th-century American male musicians
21st-century American male musicians
20th-century Canadian guitarists
21st-century Canadian guitarists
20th-century Canadian male actors
21st-century Canadian male actors
Living people
American amputees
United States Army personnel of the Vietnam War
American blues guitarists
American male guitarists
American emigrants to Canada
American expatriate male actors in Canada
American male film actors
American male television actors
American male voice actors
Amputee actors
Amputee musicians
Black Hen Music artists
Canadian amputees
Canadian blues guitarists
Canadian Folk Music Award winners
Canadian male guitarists
Canadian male film actors
Canadian male television actors
Canadian male voice actors
Guitarists from Missouri
Juno Award for Blues Album of the Year winners
Male actors from St. Louis
Male actors from Vancouver
Members of the Order of British Columbia
Musicians from St. Louis
Musicians from Vancouver
Stony Plain Records artists
United States Army soldiers